These are the rosters of all participating teams at the men's water polo tournament at the 2016 Summer Olympics in Rio de Janeiro.

Pool A

Australia
The following is the Australian roster in the men's water polo tournament of the 2016 Summer Olympics. Nathan Power was originally named, but was replaced by Tyler Martin after injuring his hand during a pre-games training camp in Croatia.

Head coach:  Elvis Fatović

Brazil
The following is the Brazilian roster in the men's water polo tournament of the 2016 Summer Olympics.

Head coach:  Ratko Rudić

Greece
The following is the Greek roster in the men's water polo tournament of the 2016 Summer Olympics.

Head coach: Thodoris Vlachos

Hungary
The following is the Hungarian roster in the men's water polo tournament of the 2016 Summer Olympics.

Head coach: Tibor Benedek

Japan
The following is the Japanese roster in the men's water polo tournament of the 2016 Summer Olympics.

Head coach: Yoji Omoto

Serbia
The following is the Serbian roster in the men's water polo tournament of the 2016 Summer Olympics.

Head coach: Dejan Savić

Pool B

Croatia
The following is the Croatian roster in the men's water polo tournament of the 2016 Summer Olympics.

Head coach: Ivica Tucak

France
The following is the French roster in the men's water polo tournament of the 2016 Summer Olympics.

Head coach: Florian Bruzzo

Italy
The following is the Italian roster in the men's water polo tournament of the 2016 Summer Olympics.

Head coach: Alessandro Campagna

Montenegro
The following is the Montenegrin roster in the men's water polo tournament of the 2016 Summer Olympics.

Head coach: Vladimir Gojković

Spain
The following is the Spanish roster in the men's water polo tournament of the 2016 Summer Olympics.

Head coach: Gabriel Hernández

United States
The following is the American roster in the men's water polo tournament of the 2016 Summer Olympics.

Head coach:  Dejan Udovičić

Statistics

Player representation by club
Clubs with 6 or more players represented are listed.

Player representation by league
The Brazilian, Greek, Japanese, Italian, Hungarian and American squads were made up entirely of players from the respective countries' domestic leagues. The Montenegrin squad was made up entirely of players employed by abroad country clubs.

Coaches representation by country
Coaches in bold represent their own country.

See also
Water polo at the 2016 Summer Olympics – Women's team rosters

References

External links

Men's team rosters
2016